Quinn Krippendorff Sullivan (born March 27, 2004) is an American professional soccer player who plays as an attacking midfielder for Major League Soccer club Philadelphia Union.

Club career
Sullivan, who is a dual citizen, began his youth career at Fishtown A.C. and then transferred to the Philadelphia Union academy where he attended the prestigious YSC Academy School. He made his professional debut at the age of 16 years old with the club's reserve team, Philadelphia Union II, on July 18, 2020 against the Pittsburgh Riverhounds. He came on as a substitute in the second half.

Sullivan officially signed for the first team on November 12, 2020 as a homegrown player alongside childhood teammate Brandan Craig. Sullivan's contract began as a rostered player for the 2021 season. His first minutes for the Union were late-game substitutions during the Union's first CONCACAF Champions League campaign. Sullivan made his first league start for the Union on June 26 against Chicago Fire, where he scored his first goal to equalize the match at 1–1. His first professional goal for the Union earned Goal of the Week honors, and he subsequently added another GOTW.

International career 
Sullivan has represented the United States under-20 team in thirteen (13) occasions.

Overall he has scored 10 goals in those appearances and added five assists. In the lead up to the CONCACAF Championship he scored a hat trick as a substitute in a come from behind win over River Plate’s reserve team and added another goal in a 2-2 tie versus the Argentina U20’s.

In CONCACAF U20 group play Quinn scored a hat trick in a 3-0 win against Cuba to finish top of the group. He also scored a brace (2 goals) against Nicaragua in the quarter finals and another goal against the host team, Honduras, in the semi-final. He has tallied three assists and a drawn pk in tournament play as well.

Personal life
Sullivan comes from a soccer family: his father, Brendan, played for five clubs over a six-year professional career in the A-League. Prior to that, Brendan Sullivan was an All-Ivy selection at University of Pennsylvania and starred at St. Joseph's Prep in Philadelphia. He then went on to coach at his alma mater. Quinn's mother, Heike, played Division I soccer and captained the University of Pennsylvania women’s team. His cousin is Chris Albright, an American international who played two seasons for the Union, and his grandfather is Larry Sullivan, who served as the head coach at Villanova from 1991 to 2007. Quinn's uncle, Bryan Sullivan, was a Division I goalkeeper at Philadelphia Textile and was also on the coaching staff at Villanova.

Career statistics

Club

Honors
United States U20
CONCACAF U-20 Championship: 2022

Individual
CONCACAF U-20 Championship Best XI: 2022

References

External links
Profile at the USSDA website

2004 births
Living people
American soccer players
American people of German descent
Soccer players from Pennsylvania
People from Radnor Township, Pennsylvania
Association football midfielders
Philadelphia Union II players
Philadelphia Union players
USL Championship players
Homegrown Players (MLS)
United States men's under-20 international soccer players
Major League Soccer players